Shaquille Walker (born February 2, 1993 in Blue Island, Illinois) is an American retired track runner competing for the United States and a former Brigham Young University track student-athlete.

Prep
Walker is African-American and born in Blue Island, Illinois. His family moved to Richmond Hill, Georgia when he was very young. Walker was raised Baptist. He converted to the Church of Jesus Christ of Latter-day Saints while in high school and served a mission for the church in the Manchester, England. Walker won 2011 Georgia High School Association AAAA state track and field title in 800 meters in a time of 1:53.27. Walker won 2010 Georgia High School Association AAAA state track and field title in 800 meters in a time of 1:51.71.

NCAA
Walker finished third at the 2016 NCAA Championships. Walker finished third at the 2016 NCAA Indoor Championships. Walker finished fifth at the 2015 NCAA Championships. Walker finished tenth at the 2015 NCAA Indoor Championships. Walker is a three time Mountain Pacific Sports Federation track and field champion (Once as a member of the 4 x 400 m relay team).

Walker finished his BYU career as the school record holder in the indoor 800 meters with a time of 1:46.97, set in 2016. He also was part of the Distance medley relay (DMR) squad that holds the program record with a time of 9:29.00, set in 2012, and the 4x400 Men's Relay squad that set the school record in 2015 with a 3:07.66 time. As an outdoor track and field athlete, Walker also holds the school record in the 800m with a time of 1:44.99, set in 2016. In 2015, Walker ran a 400m in 46:00 and sits in sixth place in the record books at Brigham Young University. His 4x400-meter relay squad holds the record with a time of 3:03.82 and the DMR record with a time of 3:14.74, both records set in 2015.

Walker qualified to compete in the 2016 U.S. Olympic Trials and placed 11th overall with a time of 1:47.93.

The Curtis Pugsley Track and Field Award is BYU track and field's highest honor, given each year to one male and one female student athlete. The winners of the 2016 Curtis Pugsley Track and Field Athlete of the Year Award are Shaquille Walker and Shea Collinsworth. Walker placed 17th in 800 meters 2012 World Junior Championships in Athletics.

Professional
Walker placed 1st in 800 meters at 2012 USA Junior Outdoor Track and Field Championships in 1:49.39.

Walker placed 6th in 800 meters at 2015 USA Outdoor Track and Field Championships in 1:46.60.

In June 2016, Walker signed a contract with Brooks Sports to represent their brand as a professional athlete. Walker placed 11th in 800 meters at 2016 United States Olympic Trials (track and field) in 1:47.93.

Walker placed 12th in 800 meters at 2017 USA Outdoor Track and Field Championships in 1:47.02.

In January 2018, FloTrack announced his retirement.

Major competition
In the summer of 2015 Walker received the gold medal in 800 meters at the 2015 Summer Universiade.

References

Sources
Robinson, Doug. " LDS convert, BYU star Shaquille Walker is a secret no more", Deseret News, Feb. 11, 2015
Dick Harmon. "Shaquille Walker's Olympic hurt will simmer for a while", Deseret News, July 6, 2016
 Jamie Parker- "Shaquille Walker was not disqualified from Olympic Trials", Savannah Now, July 3, 2016
BYU athletics profile
July 8, 2016 Salt Lake Tribune article on Walker
Shaquille Walker Athlete Biz profile

Shaquille Walker All-Athletics profile

1993 births
African-American Latter Day Saints
Living people
American Mormon missionaries in England
Converts to Mormonism from Baptist denominations
American male middle-distance runners
BYU Cougars men's track and field athletes
Sportspeople from Illinois
Universiade medalists in athletics (track and field)
Latter Day Saints from Georgia (U.S. state)
Universiade gold medalists for the United States
Medalists at the 2015 Summer Universiade